Anarak (also Romanized as Anārak; also known as Qal‘eh-ye Ḩājjī Bahman) is a village in Qeshlaq Rural District, in the Central District of Khorrambid County, Fars Province, Iran. At the 2006 census, its population was 543, in 123 families.

References 

Populated places in Khorrambid County